Mercedes Formation may refer to:
 Mercedes Formation, Uruguay, Late Cretaceous geologic formation of Uruguay
 Mercedes Formation, Colombia, Cretaceous geologic formation of Colombia which is time equivalent with the Macanal Formation